C. marina may refer to:
 Caloplaca marina, the orange sea lichen, a crustose placodioid lichen species
 Citreitalea marina, a Gram-negative and strictly aerobic bacterium from the genus of Citreitalea
 Cobetia marina, a Gram-negative marine bacterium species

See also
 Marina (disambiguation)